Leptostylus jolyi is a species of beetle in the family Cerambycidae. It was described by Monné & Hoffmann in 1981.

References

Leptostylus
Beetles described in 1981